The Lagunas de Ruidera are a group of small lakes in the Campo de Montiel, Castilla-La Mancha, between Albacete Province, and Ciudad Real Province, Spain. Most of the lakes are interconnected and their total water amount may reach 23.06 hm3, which is considerable by the standards of other lakes in the Iberian Peninsula.

The largest lakes are Laguna Colgada and Laguna del Rey. The area near the lakes is a tourist site, with small hotels, restaurants, camping sites and private villas, located mostly in or around Ruidera town. The area can be reached from Ossa de Montiel or Villahermosa.

List of lakes
There are now 15 small lakes in the group:

Albacete Province
 Laguna Colgada
 Laguna Batana
 Laguna Santos Morcillo
 Laguna Salvadora
 Laguna Lengua
 Laguna Redondilla 
 Laguna de San Pedro
 Laguna Tinaja
 Laguna Tomilla
 Laguna Conceja
 Laguna Taza. This lake was drained in order to build a camping site

Ciudad Real Province
Laguna Cenagosa
Laguna Coladilla
Laguna Cueva Morenilla
Laguna del Rey
Laguna Blanca

Ecology
There are a variety of birds in the lake shores: ducks, like the red-crested pochard, common pochard, mallard and tufted duck, as well as the Eurasian coot, common moorhen, great reed warbler, bearded reedling, purple heron, little bittern and egrets.
In the waters of the lakes there are also endemic Iberian fishes like the Rutilus lemmingii, Luciobarbus guiraonis, Iberian barbel, Luciobarbus microcephalus, Squalius pyrenaicus, as well as introduced species, like the common carp, northern pike, largemouth bass and Gambusia holbrooki.  The Procambarus clarkii is an introduced species of crayfish that has caused great damage to the local aquatic fauna.
Among the amphibians, the European tree frog, Mediterranean tree frog and the southern marbled newt are present along the shores of the lakes.

The protected area of the Lagunas de Ruidera Natural Park includes not only the lakes but also the tributary valley of San Pedro.
UNESCO has included the natural park within the biosphere reserve Mancha Húmeda.

The natural park acts as a buffer zone to the core area of the biosphere reserve, the Tablas de Daimiel wetlands.

See also
Lagunas de Ruidera Natural Park
Mancha Húmeda

References

External links

 Lagunas de Ruidera - Tourism
 Lagunas de Ruidera :: Blog
 Lagunas de Ruidera :: Rural houses to rest

Ruidera
Ramsar sites in Spain
Biosphere reserves of Spain

es:Parque natural de las Lagunas de Ruidera
fr:Parc naturel des lacs de Ruidera